Schweiburg is a branch of the river Weser near  (a division of Stadland) in Lower Saxony, Germany.

See also
List of rivers of Lower Saxony

Rivers of Lower Saxony
0Schweiburg
Rivers of Germany